Wang Dalei (meaning "Great Thunder"; born 10 January 1989) is a Chinese professional footballer who currently plays for Chinese Super League club Shandong Taishan. He is also the owner of ‘Honor 23’. A sneaker and apparel store in Beijing where Cristiano Ronaldo went to do an interview with Complex Networks for their program ‘Sneaker Shopping’

Club career
Despite being only seventeen years old, Wang Dalei started his football career with Shanghai United, making his debut on 11 March 2006 in a 1-1 draw against Inter Xian which made him the youngest professional goalkeeper in Chinese football history. He quickly made an impact within the team by establishing himself as their first-choice goalkeeper. This saw Serie A side Internazionale interested within him and invited him to train with them during the summer break. Wang returned to Shanghai where he continued to be the club's starting goalkeeper, making 22 appearances in his debut season at the end of the 2006 season and winning the Chinese Football Association Young Player of the Year award.

The following season saw Shanghai United merged with Shanghai Shenhua, leading to Wang having to fight for his position as the first-choice goalkeeper for the significantly larger squad. Nevertheless, at the end of the 2007 season, Premier League side Manchester City decided to give him a trial along with several other Shanghai players. While nothing came out of the trial, Wang's form significantly improved after a disappointing 2007 season and he established himself as the starting goalkeeper the following season where he saw the club narrowly miss out on the league title. During the league break, Wang would once again have another trial, this time with Eredivisie side PSV Eindhoven; however, because of this certain trial, Wang missed out on the club's preseason and he lost starting role to Qiu Shengjiong. With the introduction of then manager Miroslav Blažević in the 2010 season, Wang would once again be placed as the club's first-choice goalkeeper; however, his commitments to the Chinese under-23 national team saw him miss much of the season.

After a stellar 2013 season, Wang transferred to fellow Chinese Super League side Shandong Luneng on 1 January 2014. He made his debut for the club on 7 March 2014 in a 1-0 win against Harbin Yiteng. He won the 2014 Chinese FA Cup with Shandong and was awarded with the Chinese Football Association Goalkeeper of The Year award in November 2014. He would be part of more success at the club when he was part of the team that won the 2021 Chinese Super League title.

International career
Wang rose to prominence when he was part of the Chinese under-17 national team that won the 2004 AFC U-17 Championship while he also won several caps for the Chinese under-23 national team in preparation for the 2008 Summer Olympics; however, he was ultimately dropped from the final squad because he had lost his place to Qiu Shengjiong. Despite this, Wang won his place back into the team in time for the 2010 Asian Games; however, after the match against  Japan which the under-23 side lost 3-0 and in a game that saw Wang highly criticised for his performance, he posted on his microblog: "It would be flattery to call you fans. You're just a bunch of dogs. You bunch of morons are the main reason why Chinese football can't make progress. You throw in stones after a man has fallen into a well." His comments would see him suspended from the team despite making an apology.

Wang received his first call-up to the Chinese national team in May 2006 for the international friendly against Switzerland and France. He made his debut for the national team six years later on 6 September 2012 in a 1-0 loss against Sweden and was named man of the match after an impressive performance.

Career statistics

Club statistics

International statistics

Honours

Club
Shanghai Shenhua
A3 Champions Cup: 2007

Shandong Luneng/ Shandong Taishan
Chinese Super League: 2021
Chinese FA Cup: 2014, 2020, 2021, 2022
Chinese FA Super Cup: 2015

International
China under-17 national football team
AFC U-17 Championship: 2004

Individual
AFC U-17 Championship Most Valuable Player: 2004
Chinese Football Association Young Player of the Year: 2006
Chinese Football Association Goalkeeper of the Year: 2014
Chinese Super League Team of the Year: 2014
Chinese FA Super Cup Most Valuable Player: 2015

References

External links
Wang Dalei profile at Shanghai Shenhua

Wang Dalei player statistics at Sohu.com

1989 births
Living people
Association football goalkeepers
Chinese footballers
Footballers from Dalian
China international footballers
Shanghai Shenhua F.C. players
Shandong Taishan F.C. players
Chinese Super League players
Footballers at the 2006 Asian Games
Footballers at the 2010 Asian Games
2015 AFC Asian Cup players
2019 AFC Asian Cup players
Chinese Buddhists
Asian Games competitors for China